Alfredo José Campo Vintimilla (born 2 March 1993) is a professional Ecuadorian male BMX rider, representing his nation at international competitions. He competed UCI jr men world champion, current world number 5 in the Elite class

Trainers: Anderd Gronsund, Aldon Baker, Dra. Catalina Figueroa, Dr. Chris García.

Manager:  Alfredo Campo Sr. (Father)

External links
 
 
 
 

1993 births
Living people
BMX riders
Ecuadorian male cyclists
Place of birth missing (living people)
Cyclists at the 2016 Summer Olympics
Olympic cyclists of Ecuador
Pan American Games medalists in cycling
Pan American Games gold medalists for Ecuador
Pan American Games silver medalists for Ecuador
Cyclists at the 2015 Pan American Games
Medalists at the 2015 Pan American Games
Cyclists at the 2019 Pan American Games
Medalists at the 2019 Pan American Games
Cyclists at the 2020 Summer Olympics
21st-century Ecuadorian people